(The) Wrecking Crew may refer to:

Film 
Wrecking Crew (1942 film), an American film directed by Frank McDonald
The Wrecking Crew (1968 film), a 1968 film starring Dean Martin and Sharon Tate
The Wrecking Crew (2000 film), a 2000 action film starring Ice-T and Snoop Dogg
The Wrecking Crew (2008 film), a 2008 documentary film directed by Denny Tedesco

Literature 
Wrecking Crew (comics), a Marvel Comics group of supervillains
The Wrecking Crew (novel), a 1960 spy novel by Donald Hamilton
The Wrecking Crew (book), a 2008 nonfiction book by Thomas Frank
The Wrecking Crew (Wodehouse), a foursome of golfers, created by P.G. Wodehouse in 1923, infamous for their tedious pace of play
The Wrecking Crew: The Inside Story of Rock and Roll's Best-Kept Secret, a 2012 book by Kent Hartman

Music 
The Wrecking Crew (music), a group of session musicians known for working with Phil Spector and the Beach Boys
World Class Wreckin' Cru, a 1980s group featuring Dr. Dre (and originally known as the Wreckin' Cru)
Wrecking Crew, a Boston hardcore band featuring Elgin James
The Wrecking Crew, a South African Hip-Hop collective including A-Reece

Video games 
Wrecking Crew (video game), a 1984 video game
Wrecking Crew '98, 1998 sequel to the aforementioned game

Sports

Wrestling 
The Minnesota Wrecking Crew (professional wrestling), a professional wrestling tag team formed by Gene and Lars Anderson
Minnesota Wrecking Crew 2, a professional wrestling tag team featuring Mike Enos and Wayne Bloom
The Wrecking Crew, a professional wrestling tag team, active in the late 1980s with Brian Adams and Len Denton
The Wrecking Crew, a professional wrestling tag team, active in the early 1990s with Rage and Fury

American football 
The Wrecking Crew, a term to describe the defense of the Texas A&M University football team
Big Blue Wrecking Crew, a nickname for the New York Giants

Other uses
The Minnesota Wrecking Crew, a Canadian sketch comedy troupe